Laguna San Ignacio Airstrip  is a private dirt airstrip located in Laguna San Ignacio, Municipality of Mulegé, Baja California Sur, Mexico.

Laguna San Ignacio is a small village located on the San Ignacio Lagoon shore, a world-renowned nursery and breeding ground for the gray whale that is within the limits of the El Vizcaíno Biosphere Reserve.

The airstrip is used solely for general aviation purposes, specially for whale watching tourism. The RCX code is the official identifier.

External links
Baja Bush Pilots forum about RCX.
Photo of RCX runway.

Airports in Baja California Sur
Mulegé Municipality